Shirguppi is a village in Belgaum district of Karnataka, India. It is situated 2 km from Nipani City. It is famous for cash crops, sugar cane, tobacco, ground nuts. It has an ancient water supply system called "Udata Bamb" which was previously used for supplying water from Shirguppi to nearby city Nipani.

References

Villages in Belagavi district